L'Anse Saint-Jean (English: Saint-Jean Bay) is a bay located on the south shore of the Saguenay River at L'Anse-Saint-Jean, in the Le Fjord-du-Saguenay Regional County Municipality, in Quebec, Canada.

Geography 
The Saint-Jean River flows into the end of the bay.

The entrance to this bay is bounded by "Pointe au Boeuf" (located to the west) and "la Grande Pointe" (located to the east).

History 
Located between Anse du Petit Saguenay (east side) and Baie Éternité (west side), Anse Saint-Jean is a haven for pleasure boating in the event of large waves.

Gallery

See also 
Zec de la Rivière-Saint-Jean-du-Saguenay, a controlled harvesting zone

References 

Bays of Quebec
Le Fjord-du-Saguenay Regional County Municipality
Landforms of Saguenay–Lac-Saint-Jean